Andrés García Soler (born 10 April 1984) is a Spanish football manager and former player who played as a defender. He is the current manager of Swedish club Jönköpings Södra IF.

Career
Born in Algete, Community of Madrid, García was known as Karpin during his playing career, which consisted mainly of Tercera División and regional league football. In May 2007, he played 21 minutes in a Segunda División B match for CD Cobeña; the club subsequently folded. After retiring, he worked in the youth categories of Alcobendas CF before taking over EMF CD Cobeña (the replacement team of Cobeña in the city), and promoted the latter to the Segunda de Aficionados.

In 2014, García moved to China to work in the Real Madrid Foundation, but subsequently returned to his home country after being named manager of CD Canillas' Juvenil B side. On 14 July 2015, he was appointed at the helm of CD El Casar, but left in October to work as an assistant at Getafe CF's Juvenil A side.

On 27 May 2016, García was appointed manager of CD Marchamalo in the fourth division. He was sacked the following 4 April, and worked in the LaLiga Football Academy in Dubai and in the Spanish Soccer Institute in Tianjin before returning to Getafe in December 2017, now as manager of the Juvenil B team.

On 26 December 2018, García switched teams and countries again after being named under-19 manager of Norwegian side Raufoss IL. He left the club in November, and was named manager of the under-18 team of Dalian Professional in August 2020.

On 7 June 2021, García replaced sacked Patricio Lara as manager of Ecuadorian Serie A side Orense. On 12 August of the following year, he resigned.

On 1 November 2022, García returned to Raufoss, now as a first team manager. On 1 January 2023, however, he left the club after accepting an offer from Jönköpings Södra IF of the Swedish Superettan.

References

External links
 
 

1984 births
Living people
Footballers from the Community of Madrid
Spanish footballers
Association football defenders
Segunda División B players
Tercera División players
Divisiones Regionales de Fútbol players
CD Cobeña players
CU Collado Villalba players
Spanish football managers
Tercera División managers
Getafe CF non-playing staff
Orense S.C. managers
Raufoss IL managers
Jönköpings Södra IF managers
Spanish expatriate football managers
Spanish expatriate sportspeople in the United Arab Emirates
Spanish expatriate sportspeople in China
Spanish expatriate sportspeople in Norway
Spanish expatriate sportspeople in Ecuador
Spanish expatriate sportspeople in Sweden
Expatriate football managers in Norway
Expatriate football managers in China
Expatriate football managers in Ecuador
Expatriate football managers in Sweden